Dieter Gröning (born 26 July 1932) is an Australian wrestler. He competed in the men's freestyle flyweight at the 1960 Summer Olympics.

References

External links
 

1932 births
Living people
Australian male sport wrestlers
Olympic wrestlers of Australia
Wrestlers at the 1960 Summer Olympics
Sportspeople from Gdańsk